James Fergus (October 8, 1813 – June 5, 1902) was a miner, rancher, businessman and politician in Minnesota and Montana. He immigrated as a young man from Scotland and became a naturalized United States citizen. He helped develop the frontier in both territories, founding cities and counties.

Early life

Fergus was born in 1813 in Lanarkshire, Scotland. As a young man, he immigrated to the United States via Canada in 1835. He was one of the founders of Little Falls, Minnesota and later founded Fergus Falls in the same state. Fergus was naturalized and obtained his citizenship in October 1842.

In 1845 Fergus married Pamelia Dillins in Moline, Illinois. They had four children: Andrew, Mary Agnes, Luella, and Lillie.

Politics

After becoming a US citizen, Fergus became deeply interested in politics. In 1856, he was elected Judge of Probate for Morrison County, Minnesota Territory (Little Falls was in this county). Two years later, he was elected to a two-year term as Morrison County Treasurer.

Fergus moved with his family west to Montana Territory. He became involved in territorial and state politics. In 1869, Fergus was appointed to a vacant seat as county commissioner of Lewis and Clark County.

In 1873 and in 1875 Fergus served as a precinct chairman in Montana for the Republican Party. In 1879 he was elected to represent Fergus County in the Territorial House of Representatives. Fergus was instrumental to the Republican party in Montana, as chairman and through his writings in local newspapers.

In 1884 he participated in the constitutional convention in preparation for seeking admission of the territory as a state. At the same time, he promoted the organization of Fergus County and is considered its founder.

Business

In 1895, James Fergus and his son Andrew Fergus expanded their ranching business operation. They created a family corporation named Fergus Livestock and Land Company. It developed as one of biggest ranching operations in central Montana. Their ranch was located on Armells Creek in northeastern Fergus County. James died in 1902 and Andrew before his time. Due to the loss of these business leaders and the economic strains of the Great Depression, heirs were forced to sell this exceptional ranch.

Death
Fergus died June 5, 1902. Andrew Fergus died in 1928, shortly before the stock market crash and onset of the Great Depression.

Legacy
Fergus was posthumously inducted into the Montana Cowboy Hall of Fame (District 6).

References

1813 births
1902 deaths
Scottish emigrants to the United States
County commissioners in Montana
Montana Republicans
Members of the Montana Territorial Legislature
People from Fergus Falls, Minnesota
American pioneers
Montana pioneers
Naturalized citizens of the United States
19th-century American politicians